Birmingham Community Healthcare NHS Foundation Trust provides a wide range of community health services across Birmingham and the West Midlands, England. It became an NHS Foundation Trust in March 2016.

It planned to merge with Black Country Partnership NHS Foundation Trust and Dudley and Walsall Mental Health Partnership NHS Trust in October 2017.  The new organisation was projected to have an annual turnover of around £440 million – making it the third biggest mental health trust in England.

See also
 List of NHS trusts
 Healthcare in West Midlands

References

Community health NHS trusts
Health in the West Midlands (county)